Census-designated places (CDPs) are unincorporated communities lacking elected municipal officers and boundaries with legal status. There are 126 census-designated places in South Carolina.

Census-designated places

References

South Carolina